Khadg Singh (KS) Valdiya  was an Indian geologist and a former vice chancellor of Kumaon University, known for his contributions in the field of geodynamics. A 2007 recipient of Padma Shri, he was honoured again by the Government of India in 2015 with Padma Bhushan, the third highest Indian civilian award.

Biography
Internationally recognized for his path-breaking work in the fields of Geology and Environmental Science    Prof. Valdiya was born to Dev Singh Valdiya and Nanda Valdiya on 20 March 1937 in Myanmar. In 1947 his family returned to their hometown in Pithoragarh in the Indian state of Uttarakhand. After schooling in Pithoragarh, he did his bachelor (BSc), masters (MSc) and doctoral (PhD) studies at Lucknow University and joined the university as a member of faculty in 1957. A 1965–66 Fulbright scholar at Johns Hopkins University, he had also taught at Rajasthan University, Wadia Institute of Himalayan Geology, Jawaharlal Nehru Centre for Advanced Scientific Research (JNCASR) and Kumaon University. He was the vice chancellor of Kumaon University in 1981.

Valdiya had been involved with the establishment of such geological institutions as Wadia Institute of Himalayan Geology, Central Himalayan Environmental Association, Nainital, G. B. Pant Institute of Himalayan Environment and Development, Almora, and the Geology Department of the Kumaon University. He is an elected fellow of Indian National Science Academy, National Academy of Sciences, India (FNASc), Indian Academy of Sciences (FASc), and the Third World Academy of Sciences (FTWAS) and is a fellow of Geological Society of India, Geological Society of America and Geological Society of Nepal. He had served as a member of the Scientific Advisory Council to the Prime Minister of India. 
He has written over 110 research papers, authored 22 books, edited 9 books and penned 40 articles in Hindi towards popularization of science.

Field of Specialization
Tectonics with special reference to active faults.

Environmental Geology with special reference to natural hazards and geo-hydrology of springs.

Key Contributions

Geology
He has made significant contributions to Himalayan Geology through a sustained and comprehensive study of the Kumaon Himalayas. These include pioneering studies of cyano-bacterial stromatolites leading to fixing of age of crucial stratigraphic horizons; systematic investigations of economically rich magnesite deposits; sedimentological and palaeocurrent study of the Precambrian flysch leading to reconstruction of palaeogeography of northern India; and the structural study of geodynamically sensitive areas leading to the tectonic synthesis and evolutionary history of the Himalayas.

Departing from mainstream thinking and pursuing independent lines,  K.S. Valdiya has contributed to Himalayan Geology through a sustained and comprehensive study of the Uttarakhand Himalayas. His internationally recognized works are based on the painstaking mapping of mountainous terrain, traversing thousands of kilometers on foot. This body of work has made the Uttarakhand Himalayas one of the best documented, most thoroughly studied sectors of the Himalayan Mountain Arc.

He has provided highly original scientific insights to the quintessential Continental Collision on the basis of his study of the dome-shaped Crustal upwarps in the immediate proximity of the zone of collision of India with Asia.

His recent work has focused on active faults and land-form development — landscape reshaping related to neo-tectonism. In addition, his studies on natural hazards like mass-movements and hydro-geology of mountain springs having great bearing on management of environment and planning for the ecological integrity of the mountains.

Environment & Social Development

His well-researched scientific report on the destabilizing effect of limestone quarrying formed the principal basis of the Supreme Court banning limestone mining in the Mussourie Hills.

In a pioneering and benchmark   study on declining discharges of mountain springs, he developed the concept and methodology of spring sanctuary and demonstrated its workability by successfully augmenting the spring discharge in a catchment area of a multidisciplinary 10-year project on sustainable development. (The programme of spring sanctuary has been adopted in many areas in Uttarakhand).

Deeply an intimately involved in ecodevelopment through people’s participation such as the development of spring sanctuaries, afforestation in village panchayat lands, linkages of animal husbandry, horticulture and agriculture in 7 villages in Kumaun under the aegis of an NGO (Central Himalayan Environment Association)

Organization Development 

KS Valdiya was intimately involved in the conceptualization, establishment and development of the Wadia Institute of Himalayan Geology (now at Dehradun), the Central Himalayan Environment Association (Nainital), the G.B. Pant Institute of Himalayan Environment and Development (Katarmal, Almora), and the Department of Geology in Kumaun University (Nainital).

Popularization of Science

For the last few years, KS Valdiya has been working on a Science Outreach Programme to popularize Science among young students, in the remote regions of Uttarakhand.

Along with leading teachers and specialists from various disciplines, he has been delivering and organizing lectures on the application of science, the avenues & opportunities for young minds, as well as offering career guidance to pre-university college students.

Books

He has written over 120 research papers, authored 21 books , edited 9 books and penned 40 articles in Hindi towards popularization of science.

These include Geology of Kumaon Lesser Himalaya (1980), Aspects of Tectonics: Focus on South-central Asia (1984), Environmental Geology: Indian Context (1987), Dynamic Himalaya (1998), Himalaya: Emergence and Evolution (2001),Kumaun Land and People (2001),Saraswati, the River That Disappeared (2002), The Making of India: Geodynamic Evolution (2010), and Ek Thi Nadi Saraswati (2010, in Hindi)., Geography, Peoples and Geodynamics of India in Puranas and Epics: A Geologist's Interpretations (2012), Prehistoric River Saraswati, Western India: Geological Appraisal and Social Aspects  (2018), Neotectonism in the Indian Subcontinent: Landscape Evolution   (2017)(Co-authored with Jaishri Sanwal)

His autobiography "पथरीली पगडंडियों पर" was published by PAHAR  in 2015.

In year 2017, He wrote a biography of famous environmentalist and Chipko leader Padma Vibhushan Sunderlal Bahuguna named ‘हिमालय में महात्मा गांधी के सिपाही सुंदरलाल बहुगुणा’  published by Sasta Sahitya Mandal

See also
 Geodynamics
 Neotectonics
 Sedimentology

References

Recipients of the Padma Bhushan in science & engineering
Recipients of the Padma Shri in science & engineering
Indian geologists
Living people
1937 births
Indian endocrinologists
Recipients of the Shanti Swarup Bhatnagar Prize for Science and Technology
Recipients of the Shanti Swarup Bhatnagar Award in Earth, Atmosphere, Ocean & Planetary Sciences
People from Pithoragarh
Medical doctors from Uttarakhand
20th-century Indian medical doctors
Sarasvati River